The 2016 French Road Cycling Cup was the 25th edition of the French Road Cycling Cup. It was the first edition in which all riders are eligible to score points, whereas in previous seasons only French riders or riders part of French teams were eligible. The team classification however remained a contest between the French teams only. Compared to the previous season, the same 16 events were part of the cup. The defending champion from the last season was Nacer Bouhanni.

The series turned out to be a close fight between two times winner Samuel Dumoulin and Belgian sprinter Baptiste Planckaert, with both riders separated by just one point before the final race. Dumoulin finished ahead of Planckaert in the final race, taking his third overall win.

Events

Race Results

Final standings

Individual
As a change compared to previous editions, all riders are eligible for this classification, not only those that are French or compete for a French-licensed team as was the case until 2015.

Young rider classification
As a change compared to previous editions, all riders younger than 25 are eligible for this classification, not only those that are French or compete for a French-licensed team as was the case until 2015.

Teams
Only French teams are eligible to be classified in the teams classification.

References

External links
  Official website

French Road Cycling Cup
French Road Cycling Cup
Road Cycling